Altars of Desire is a 1927 American silent drama film directed by Christy Cabanne and starring silent movie star Mae Murray.  It was produced and released by MGM.

A  print of Altars of Desire survives and is preserved by MGM.

Synopsis
Claire (Murray) is sent to Paris by her father (Edeson) to acquire some refinement. A treasure-hunter (Beranger) stalks her, but so does good guy David Elrod (Tearle), who rescues her.

Cast
 Mae Murray as Claire Sutherland
 Conway Tearle as David Elrod
 Robert Edeson as John Sutherland
 Maude George as Kitty Pryor
 George Beranger as Count André D'Orville

References

External links

Stills at silenthollywood.com

1927 films
1927 drama films
American silent feature films
American black-and-white films
Films directed by Christy Cabanne
Metro-Goldwyn-Mayer films
Silent American drama films
1920s American films